Kübra Öçsoy Korkut, aka Kübra Korkut, (born Kübra Öçsoy on 20 January 1994 in Sorgun, Yozgat Province, Turkey) is a Turkish para table tennis player of class 7 and Paralympian.

She lost one arm and both legs due to injuries sustained from an electric shock accident, which occurred as she was four years old. Since her age of eight, Korkut has prosthesis in her legs. Encouraged by her teachers, she began para table tennis playing.

Korkut took part at the 2012 Summer Paralympics competing in the women's individual class 7 event, at which she became 4th after losing 1–3 to her opponent from Ukraine in the bronze medal match. Furthermore, she was part of the Turkish team with her teammate Neslihan Kavas, who became silver medalist in the women's team class 6–10 event after losing to the Chinese team in the final.

She captured the silver medal in the individual C7 event at the 2016 Paralympics in Rio de Janeiro, Brazil.

Achievements

Notes

Living people
1994 births
People from Sorgun, Yozgat
Sportspeople from Yozgat
Turkish amputees
Turkish female table tennis players
Paralympic table tennis players of Turkey
Table tennis players at the 2012 Summer Paralympics
Table tennis players at the 2016 Summer Paralympics
Medalists at the 2012 Summer Paralympics
Medalists at the 2016 Summer Paralympics
Paralympic medalists in table tennis
Paralympic silver medalists for Turkey
Table tennis players at the 2020 Summer Paralympics
Paralympic bronze medalists for Turkey
Medalists at the 2020 Summer Paralympics
20th-century Turkish sportswomen
21st-century Turkish sportswomen